Zinc finger protein 7 is a protein that in humans is encoded by the ZNF7 gene.

Interactions
ZNF7 has been shown to interact with RPL7.

References

Further reading

External links 
 

Transcription factors